The Coastal Mountain Range, also known as the Hai'an Range, is a mountain range situated on the eastern coast of the island of Taiwan, and spans the border between Hualien and Taitung Counties. The Coastal Mountain Range is the northern portion of the Luzon Arc but do not present current volcanic activity. Its geology is mainly composed of a Miocene volcanic basement covered by a thick (ca.4-6km) sedimentary pile of deep to shallow marine clastic deposits mostly derived from the adjacent Central Range mountains to the west.

Currently those peaks are still rising with an annual speed of 3 mm. The Hai'an Range is also converging with Central Mountain Range with an average speed of 2.3 cm per year.

There are several small basins located around the range, the largest of which is Taiyuan Basin.

Gallery

See also
Hualien
Taitung
Convergent boundary

Mountain ranges of Taiwan
Landforms of Hualien County
Landforms of Taitung County